The 2018 Hungarian Pro Circuit Ladies Open was a professional tennis tournament played on outdoor clay courts. It was the third edition of the tournament and was part of the 2018 ITF Women's Circuit. It took place in Budapest, Hungary, on 9–15 July 2018.

Singles main draw entrants

Seeds 

 1 Rankings as of 2 July 2018.

Other entrants 
The following players received a wildcard into the singles main draw:
  Anna Bondár
  Ágnes Bukta
  Dalma Gálfi
  Réka Luca Jani

The following players received entry from the qualifying draw:
  Nicoleta Dascălu
  Alena Fomina
  Magdaléna Pantůčková
  Panna Udvardy

The following player received entry as a lucky loser:
  Alexandra Panova

Champions

Singles

 Viktória Kužmová def.  Ekaterina Alexandrova, 6–3, 4–6, 6–1

Doubles

 Alexandra Cadanțu /  Chantal Škamlová def.  Kaitlyn Christian /  Giuliana Olmos, 6–1, 6–3

External links 
 2018 Hungarian Pro Circuit Ladies Open at ITFtennis.com
 Official website 

2018 ITF Women's Circuit
2018 in Hungarian women's sport
 
2018 in Hungarian tennis